The National Bowling Stadium is a  ten-pin bowling stadium in Reno, Nevada. The stadium is recognizable for an  aluminum geodesic dome in its facade, built to resemble a large bowling ball.

Nicknamed the "Taj Mahal of tenpins", the 78-lane stadium opened on February 3, 1995, cost $47.5 million, and took three years to build. It is often the filming location for bowling scenes in films.

Construction and financing
The stadium was constructed as part of a renovation effort of downtown Reno, which also saw the construction of the Silver Legacy Resort Casino, The concept for construction of the stadium was in part to capture tourism dollars being sent to Las Vegas, and as part of an agreement with the United States Bowling Congress that upon construction of a first-class permanent facility, they would ensure their return to Reno every third year. The project was funded by a room tax lobbied by the city of Reno to the Nevada Legislature based on commitments from the United States Bowling Congress and the Women's International Bowling Congress, which itself merged with the USBC in 2005.

The original construction of the stadium had 80 lanes, but since an architectural error resulted in the stadium not having a center aisle for bowlers to march out for the team event, the center lanes had to be converted to an aisle. Despite the conversion to a 78-lane facility, the main pro shop/gift shop is still called "Lane 81".

Features
The stadium can be covered to be converted to convention space.  It utilizes fully automatic scoring on what (upon construction) was the world's longest rigid, backlight video screen, with oversight from a computerized command center on the stadium's fifth level. When it opened in 1995, it was just in time to welcome 100,000 members of the American Bowling Congress for their 100th anniversary meeting. In 2009 the National Bowling Stadium broke the record for most United States Bowling Congress championships hosted, surpassing the tie between Buffalo and Toledo.

The stadium also hosts an extension of the International Bowling Museum and Hall of Fame (IBM/HF), which is located in Arlington, Texas. The museum displays hall-of-fame portraits as well as artifacts collected and preserved by the IBM/HF.

Film history
The National Bowling Stadium has been the filming location for several feature films.  In addition to being the location of the grand finale between Bill Murray and Woody Harrelson's characters in the 1996 bowling film Kingpin, the stadium was also a setting in the Michael J. Fox/Kirk Douglas film Greedy.

References

External links

 National Bowling Stadium
 Bowl Reno

Buildings and structures in Reno, Nevada
Sports venues completed in 1995
Tourist attractions in Reno, Nevada